Great Britain was one of twenty-eight nations to send athletes to the 1968 Summer Paralympics in Tel Aviv, Israel from November 4 to 13, 1968. The team finished second in the medal table and won sixty-nine medals: twenty-nine gold, twenty silver and twenty bronze. Athletes from the whole United Kingdom, including Northern Ireland, were able to compete for the team. Seventy-five British athletes took part in the Games; fifty-one men and twenty-four women.

Disability classifications

The Paralympics groups athletes' disabilities into one of five disability categories; amputation, the condition may be congenital or sustained through injury or illness; cerebral palsy; wheelchair athletes, there is often overlap between this and other categories; visual impairment, including blindness; Les autres, any physical disability that does not fall strictly under one of the other categories, for example dwarfism or multiple sclerosis. Each Paralympic sport then has its own classifications, dependent on the specific physical demands of competition. Events are given a code, made of numbers and letters, describing the type of event and classification of the athletes competing.

Medalists

Medals by sport

Dartchery

The only dartchery event at the Games was the mixed pairs event which took a knockout format. Two British pairs entered the competition: Nicholson  and Taylor beat a team from Jamaica in the first round but lost in the second round to the Swiss pair; Robertson and Todd reached the third round where they lost to Italians Francesco Deiana and Raimondo Longhi.

Snooker

One snooker event was contested at the Games, the men's open event. Keaton was eliminated in the first round by Jimmy Gibson of Ireland. Michael Shelton had wins over Goll, of Austria, and Newton from Australia to earn a place in the final against Gibson. Shelton defeated Gibson to take gold and the Irishman won the silver medal.

Swimming

Twenty-nine British swimmers competed at the Games winning twenty-eight medals: thirteen gold, seven silver and eight bronze. Forder won three gold medals in women's 50 m class 3 complete events, finishing first in the backstroke, breaststroke and freestyle. Six other swimmers won multiple medals for Great Britain; Bellamy won two gold medals and a bronze in the women's class 5 (cauda equina); Britton, a gold, silver and bronze in men's class 2 incomplete events; Ellis, two golds and a silver in men's class 2 complete; Gibbs who won gold in the women's 3×25 m individual medley open and bronze in the 100 m freestyle open; Thornton who took a gold, silver and bronze in men's class 3 complete events; and West who won backstroke silver and freestyle bronze for men's class 1 complete events. Ingrams won gold in the women's 25 m backstroke class 1 incomplete in a world record time; White  and Rosaleen Gallagher of Ireland won the silver and bronze medals in the event.

Table tennis

Twenty five British players entered table tennis events and won ten medals; three gold, 4 silver and four bronze.  In the women's doubles C event Bryant and Barnard won the gold medal after beating pairs from the United States, Jamaica, Belgium and Australia.

See also
Great Britain at the 1968 Summer Olympics

Notes

References

Nations at the 1968 Summer Paralympics
1968
Paralympics